Dr. Mok Ying Ren (born 6 July 1988) is a triathlete and long-distance runner from Singapore. His best performances include a SEA Games gold medal in 2007 in the triathlon event, as well as a gold medal in the marathon event in 2013. He held the national record in the 5000m event from May 2011 to July 2021.

Early life and education 
Mok Ying Ren was born on 6 July 1988 in Singapore. His father was an engineer with Housing and Development Board, and his mother was a housewife. Additionally, he has a younger sister, 6 years younger, Mok Ying Rong. He studied at Red Swastika Primary School, Raffles Institution, and then Raffles Junior College. He graduated from the National University Singapore Yong Loo Lin School of Medicine in 2012. He also completed Masters in Sports Medicine with the University of Queensland in 2016.

Career

Athletics 
Mok is a 7-time Singapore Marathon Local Champion, capturing every title from 2009 to 2016 with the exception of a 3rd-place finish in 2012. Mok first won the 2009 Singapore Marathon with a time of 2:43:42 on his debut marathon. At the 2010 Singapore Marathon, his second marathon, he broke his own course record for the local category with a time of 2:38:27. Mok once again won the 2011 Singapore Marathon Local Category with a time of 2:46:01 despite battling a bad case of plantar fasciitis.

Mok ran a new Singaporean men's 5000 m national record of 14:51:09 at the Tokai University Time Trials in Japan in May 2011. The record was broken by Soh Rui Yong in July 2021.

Medical career 
Mok disrupted his national service (NS) obligations to pursue medical studies. Upon completing his housemanship in various hospitals, he rejoined Singapore Armed Forces serving as a medical officer. After completing his NS obligations, he is since a medical doctor within Singapore's government hospital network.

Mok completed his Masters of Sports Medicine from the University of Queensland, Australia in 2017. He began his Orthopaedics Surgery Residency program in 2017. He completed his training in 2022 and is now working in the National University Health System.

Personal life 
Mok married Belinda Ooi on 30 December 2017, after having dated for four years. They have a daughter (born on 15 December 2019) and a son (born 21 August 2021).

References

Living people
1988 births
Singaporean male long-distance runners
Singaporean male triathletes
Singaporean people of Chinese descent
National University of Singapore alumni
Singaporean male marathon runners
Southeast Asian Games medalists in athletics
Southeast Asian Games gold medalists for Singapore
Southeast Asian Games medalists in triathlon
Competitors at the 2007 Southeast Asian Games
Competitors at the 2013 Southeast Asian Games